A hearing dog is a type of assistance dog specifically selected and trained to assist people who are deaf or hard of hearing by alerting their handler to important sounds, such as doorbells, smoke alarms, ringing telephones, or alarm clocks. They may also work outside the home, alerting their handler to sounds such as sirens, forklifts, and a person calling the handler's name.

Training

Dogs that may become hearing dogs are tested for proper temperament, sound reactivity, and willingness to work. After passing initial screenings, they are trained in basic obedience and exposed to things they will face in public areas, such as elevators, shopping carts, and different types of people. Only after that period of socializing are they considered to be fully trained in sound alerting.

Hearing dogs may be trained professionally in as little as three months, though many are trained for at least a year. Generally, training involves getting the dog to recognize a particular sound and then physically alert or lead their handler to the source. They may also be taught to physically alert to and/or lead away from a sound, such as in the case of a fire alarm.

While many hearing dogs are professionally trained, as described above, it is important to note that this is not a legal requirement and there are deaf or hearing-impaired individuals who successfully, and legally, undertake the challenge of training their own hearing dogs. However, such dogs might not meet the requirements as stipulated by Assistance Dogs International, and therefore might not have full access to all public spaces and places afforded by such accreditation.

Accessibility
In the United States, Title III of the Americans with Disabilities Act of 1990 allows hearing dogs, along with guide and service dogs, access to anywhere the general public is permitted. The Fair Housing Act allows hearing dogs as well as other types of assistance animals to visit and live in housing developments that have no pets policies. The U.S. Department of Housing and Urban Development's Office of Fair Housing and Equal Opportunity investigates complaints from the public alleging denials of reasonable accommodation requests involving assistance animals.  Some state laws also provide access protection or additional guidelines, such as fines or criminal penalties for interfering with or denying access to a hearing dog team.

Hearing dogs often wear a bright orange leash and collar to identify them. Some also wear a cape or jacket, which may or may not be orange. Incidentally, in the United States, a hearing, signal, guide, or any other service dog is not legally required to have or wear any badge, leash, collar, or any other identifying item.

In the United Kingdom, hearing dogs wear distinctive burgundy jackets bearing the logo of the charity (Hearing Dogs for Deaf People) which trains and funds them.

In Australia, hearing dogs are trained through the Lions Club International of Australia.  They wear a bright orange leash, collar, and harness to identify them, and carry with them an issued ID. They are legally permitted access to any locations that are open to members of the public, so long as they are with their handler.

Some breeds notable for selection as hearing dogs include golden retrievers, poodles, cocker spaniels, labrador retrievers, and cockapoos.

See also
 Dogs for Deaf and Disabled Americans
 Hearing Dogs for Deaf People
 Assistance dog

References

Assistance dogs
Deaf culture